Eccoptoptera is a genus of beetles in the family Carabidae, containing the following species:

 Eccoptoptera cupricollis Chaudoir, 1878
 Eccoptoptera mutilloides (Bertoloni, 1857)

References

Anthiinae (beetle)